Cwmbach is a small hamlet in Stradey Woods (Coed y Strade) between Llanelli  and Trimsaran in Carmarthenshire, Wales. The village was home to a (now closed) chapel and a (now closed) public house. It is based around the Afon Cwmmawr and Afon Dulais that join together in the heart of the hamlet, and meet the sea at Ffynnon Helyg at nearby Pwll. Welsh is the dominant language.

Hamlets in Wales
Villages in Carmarthenshire